José Jiménez Lozano (13 May 1930 – 9 March 2020) was a Spanish writer. In 2002 he was awarded the Miguel de Cervantes Prize.

Biography
Jiménez Lozano was born in Langa, a village in the province of  Ávila. After finishing his studies in 1962, he became a journalist and writer, winning the Cervantes Prize in 2002.  Not well known to the general public, he emphasized religious and social themes in both his journalism and his novels.

Works
 Historia de un otoño (novel) (1971)
 El sambenito (novel) (1972)
 La salamandra (novel) (1973)
 El santo de mayo (novel) (1976)
 Guía espiritual de Castilla (essays) (1984)
 Avila (essays) (1988)
 El grano de maíz rojo (novel) (1988)
 El empleo (novel) (1989)
 El mudejarillo (novel) (1992)
 Tantas devastaciones (poems) (1992)
 La boda de Ángela (novel) (1993)
 Teorema de Pitágoras (novel) (1995)
 Un fulgor tan breve (poems) (1995)
 Las sandalias de plata (novel) (1996)
 El tiempo de Eurídice (poems) (1996)
 Los compañeros (novel) (1997)

Adaptations
 Tom Ojos Azules is the basis of a children's opera (2016) of the same name by American composer John Craton, with libretto by José Jiménez Lozano.

References

External links
 El Poder de la Palabra  paragraph with short bio and bibliography
 Premio Cervantes longer biography

1930 births
2020 deaths
Spanish journalists
Spanish male writers
Spanish Roman Catholics
Premio Cervantes winners
Writers from Castile and León
University of Salamanca alumni
People from the Province of Ávila